Ted Bundy is a 2002 crime horror thriller film written and directed by Matthew Bright, and co-written by Stephen Johnston. A limited theatrical release, it is a fictionalized dramatization of the crimes of Ted Bundy, an American serial killer who raped and murdered dozens of women and girls throughout the United States during the 1970s. It stars Michael Reilly Burke as the titular character, and Boti Bliss as Bundy's girlfriend, Lee.

Plot 

In Seattle in 1974, law student Ted Bundy appears to be the typical friendly guy who lives next door, but inside this kind gentleman lies a monster. After watching women from their windows while masturbating, Ted builds up the courage to commit his first murder. From there, he always manages to lure a young woman to his car by faking a broken arm or an illness or by disguising himself as a police officer. Then he knocks her unconscious, ties her up, and drives her to an arranged location where he rapes and murders her. Driving his yellow VW Beetle, he leaves a bloody trail through the United States. The police are left in the dark, as no one suspects a model citizen and ambitious student like Ted.

Eventually, in 1975, one of Ted's victims, Tina Gabler, escapes from him when she throws herself from his moving car. Based on her description of his car, Ted is stopped by a police officer and arrested. In his trunk, the police find pantyhose masks, a hand saw, a crowbar, knives, ropes, and handcuffs. Even though he is identified by Tina Gabler in a lineup, Ted denies ever having seen the woman. When he is visited by his girlfriend, Lee, in a Colorado prison, Ted admits to her that charges are being brought against him for multiple murders, but stresses the fact that there is no evidence, however, and that he will never be convicted; at this point, Lee realizes that Ted is guilty, and she breaks up with him.

Ted asks to represent himself at his trial, and is granted access to the courthouse law library. He promptly escapes by jumping from an upper story window. He is jailed again after an attempted auto theft, but manages to escape yet again months later. Upon settling in Florida, Ted rents a room under an alias, steals a van, and continues his murder spree. This time he overpowers four women in their sorority house and brutally murders two of them. His bloodlust still unsatisfied, Ted rapes and murders a twelve-year old girl the next day. He becomes heavily intoxicated afterward, and is recognized by a police officer and arrested after a short chase.

Ted is convicted in court and sentenced to death. After making an unsuccessful plea for mercy to the governor, Ted makes a final statement before he is executed in the electric chair; the executioner is revealed to be a woman. As Lee watches news coverage of the execution with her husband, she wonders, "Who was Ted Bundy?"

Cast

Release 

The film had a limited theatrical release in the United States, in locations such as New York City and Los Angeles, in September 2002. In American, it grossed $1,710 on its opening weekend and $6,073 in total, and internationally it grossed $62,643, for a total sum of $68,716.

Home media
Ted Bundy was released in the U.S. on DVD on October 1, 2002 and in the U.K. in November 2003 under the title Bundy. 
The film was released for the first time on Blu-ray disc by home video company Vinegar Syndrome on January 31, 2023.

Reception 

On review aggregator Rotten Tomatoes, the film holds an approval rating of 41% based on twenty-two reviews, with an average rating of 5/10. The website's critical consensus reads, "Ted Bundy wastes an impressive performance from Michael Reilly Burke on an exploitative film devoid of any social context or depth." Metacritic assigned the film a weighted average score of 37 out of 100, based on eleven critics, indicating "generally unfavorable" reviews.

While critical of the film's "really offensive" final scene, Chauncey Gardner of Ain't It Cool News otherwise heaped praise on it, writing, "It's the movie American Psycho wanted to be, a balls out, no punches pulled examination of a sick and twisted soul." Maitland McDonagh of TV Guide gave the film a score of 3/5, offered kudos to Matthew Bright for not glamorizing or fetishizing Ted Bundy or his crimes, and praised Burke's acting, calling it "dead on" and a performance that perfectly evoked "the subtle wrongness beneath the facade that gripped the public imagination." Derek Elley of Variety also praised the "pulpy" and humorously macabre film, deeming it a "quality low-budgeter" that felt like a "disturbingly stygian comedy-drama" with a sine qua non performance by Burke.

The Christian Science Monitor had a lukewarm response to the film, calling it a "melodrama" and giving it a score of 2/4 before writing, "It's grisly going, but no more exploitative than a lot of mainstream TV reporting about violent crime." Marrit Ingman of The Austin Chronicle gave Ted Bundy a score of 1/5, having found aspects like its disquieting atmosphere and commentary on 1970s society to have been undermined by how "muddled" its tone was, ultimately concluding that that the film did not seem to know "what to say about its subject." Similarly, Neil Smith of the BBC lambasted the film, giving it a score of 2/5 while disparaging it as nothing but an "orgy of gratuitous violence" in which "We learn next to nothing about what made Bundy tick, and leave no closer to understanding how such aberrations occur."

Peter Bradshaw of The Guardian found the film to be a plodding and "drearily pointless" affair, and wrote, "This picture is arguably more honest than sexy star vehicles like Red Dragon. That doesn't stop it from being unrewarding, unpleasant and very, very boring." David Chute of LA Weekly was critical of the film's tone, derisively stating, "It's possible that something hip and transgressive was being attempted here that stubbornly refused to gel, but the result is more puzzling than unsettling." Mike D'Angelo of Time Out was largely dismissive of the film, opining that there was "too much exploitation and too little art" and that, "The sight of ordinary-looking people committing unspeakably vicious acts no longer carries an inherent charge, and Ted Bundy offers little else."

Jack Mathews of the New York Daily News condemned the film, deriding it as nothing but "revolting exploitation" and further stating, "If the goal of this biographical horror film about one of America's sickest serial killers was to be as loathsome as its subject, mission accomplished." Likewise, Megan Turner of the New York Post deemed the film a "trashy, exploitative, thoroughly unpleasant experience" that was both "tone-deaf" and "more than a little misogynistic." In a review written for The Village Voice, Michael Atkinson opined that the film "never digs very deep" and concluded, "In the end, Ted Bundy's only justification is the director's common but unexplored fascination with the frustrated maniac; there's no larger point, and little social context. Badlands this ain't."

Matthew Reilly Burke and Boti Bliss were nominated for Best Actor and Best Supporting Actress, respectively, at the 2003 Fangoria Chainsaw Awards.

See also 

 Bundy: An American Icon, a 2009 film about Ted Bundy
 Extremely Wicked, Shockingly Evil and Vile, a 2019 film about Ted Bundy
 No Man of God, a 2021 film about Ted Bundy
 Ted Bundy: American Boogeyman, a 2021 film about Ted Bundy

References

External links 

 
 

2002 black comedy films
2002 crime thriller films
2002 films
2002 horror films
2002 independent films
2002 psychological thriller films
2000s American films
2000s biographical films
2000s British films
2000s English-language films
2000s exploitation films
2000s horror thriller films
2000s police films
2000s psychological horror films
2000s serial killer films
American biographical films
American black comedy films
American crime thriller films
American exploitation films
American films based on actual events
American horror thriller films
American independent films
American police films
American psychological horror films
American psychological thriller films
American serial killer films
BDSM in films
Biographical films about serial killers
British biographical films
British black comedy films
British crime thriller films
British exploitation films
British films based on actual events
British horror thriller films
British independent films
British police films
British psychological horror films
British psychological thriller films
British serial killer films
Crime films based on actual events
Crime horror films
Cultural depictions of American men
Cultural depictions of kidnappers
Cultural depictions of male serial killers
Cultural depictions of rapists
Fictional portrayals of the Seattle Police Department
Films about capital punishment
Films about child death
Films about child sexual abuse
Films about domestic violence
Films about infidelity
Films about prison escapes
Films about Ted Bundy
Films about rape in the United States
Films directed by Matthew Bright
Films set in 1974
Films set in 1975
Films set in 1976
Films set in 1977
Films set in 1978
Films set in 1989
Films set in Colorado
Films set in Florida
Films set in prison
Films set in Salt Lake City
Films set in Seattle
Films shot in Los Angeles
Films shot in Los Angeles County, California
Films shot in Santa Clarita, California
Films with screenplays by Matthew Bright
Home invasions in film
Horror films based on actual events
Law enforcement in Florida in fiction
Masturbation in fiction
Necrophilia in film
Period horror films
Thriller films based on actual events